Thuc-Quyen Nguyen is director and Professor at the Center for Polymers and Organic Solids (CPOS), and a professor of the Chemistry & Biochemistry department at the University of California Santa Barbara. Her research focuses on organic electronic devices, using optical, electrical, and structural techniques to understand materials and devices such as photovoltaics, LEDs, and field-effect transistors.



Early life and education 
Professor Nguyen was born in Ban Me thuot Vietnam in 1970. She was curious from an early age, always trying to understand how things work. She also says that she was inspired from an early age to become a teacher. There are four generations of teachers in her family, and as a young child, she went along to her mother's classes as there was no daycare to attend. These experiences sparked interest in being an effective teacher

In 1991, when she was 21, she moved with her family to the United States, arriving with very little knowledge of English. To try to improve her language skills and progress through school, she attended three schools at once, going to morning, afternoon, and evening classes. Her first term at Santa Monica College, she took four ESL courses at the same time, and after a year, was able to begin normal coursework.

After graduating from Santa Monica College in 1995 with an A.S., she began working toward a bachelor's degree at UCLA, while also work in the library in evenings to help pay for University. She also began working in a biology lab, beginning by washing glassware, before becoming more involved in experiments that further increased her interest in scientific research.

Research and career 
Professor Nguyen completed her masters in 1998, and PhD in 2001, both from UCLA.  In her PhD, she processed and studied conducting polymers using ultrafast spectroscopy under the supervision of Professor Benjamin Schwartz.

After her PhD, Professor Nguyen worked as a research associate at Columbia University, with Professor Louis Brus. She also worked for some time after her PhD at the IBM Thomas J Watson Research Center. In 2004, Nguyen joined UCSB Chemistry and Biochemistry department as an assistant professor, and received appointment to full professor in 2011. She collaborates with her boyfriend Guillermo Bazan who also works in the same area at UCSB [4]. 

Professor Nguyen's current research focuses on organic electronic devices. She studies how chemical structure influence performance and function of organic devices like PVs, OLEDs, OFETs. She is interested in improving organic solar cells as well as developing flexible electronics.

Awards 

 2005 Office of Naval Research Young Investigator Award.
 2006 NSF CAREER award.
 2007 Harold Plous Award.
 2008 Camille Dreyfus Teacher-Scholar Award.
 2009 Alfred P. Sloan Research Fellow.
 2010 Alexander von Humboldt Senior Research Award.
 2010 American Competitiveness and Innovation Fellowship (ACI).
 2015-2019 World's most influential scientific minds.

See also 
 VinFuture

References

External link 
 
1970 births
Living people

University of California, Santa Barbara faculty
Women biochemists
Vietnamese scientists
Santa Monica College alumni